Mégroz or Megroz is a surname. Notable people with the surname include:

Alfred Mégroz (1884–1956), Swiss figure skater
R. L. Mégroz (1891–1968), English writer, critic, and poet